The 1951–52 Greek Football Cup was the tenth edition of the Greek Football Cup. The competition culminated with the Greek Cup Final, replayed at Leoforos Alexandras Stadium, on 15 June 1952, because of the previous match (1 June) draw. The match was contested by Olympiacos and Panionios, with Olympiacos winning by 2–0.

Calendar

Qualification round

First round

||colspan="2" rowspan="16" 

||colspan="2" rowspan="4" 

||colspan="2" 

||colspan="2" rowspan="13" 

 
||colspan="2" rowspan="2" 

||colspan="2" rowspan="15" 

||colspan="2" rowspan="41" 

|}

1Suspended. Both teams were zeroed.

2AEK Patras was also qualified to the third round.

3Suspended due to rainfall.

4Ellispontos was zeroed.

5Suspended at the 80th minute due to incidents. That remained as the final score.

Second round

||colspan="2" rowspan="9" 

||colspan="2" rowspan="19" 

 

||colspan="2" rowspan="19" 

|}

* Pelops Kiato qualified on a draw after two ties.

** Hellas Florina was zeroed.

*** Suspended at the second half.

****Orfeas Xanthi was zeroed.

Third round

||colspan="2" rowspan="20" 

||colspan="2" rowspan="5" 

|}

Fourth round

||colspan="2" rowspan="6" 

||colspan="2" rowspan="10" 

|}

* Panegieus qualified on a draw after two ties.

Additional round

|}

Fifth round

|}

* Suspended due to incidents.

Knockout phase
In the knockout phase, teams play against each other over a single match. If the match ends up as a draw, extra time will be played and if the match remains a draw a replay match is set at the home of the guest team which the extra time rule stands as well. If a winner doesn't occur after the replay match the winner emerges by a flip of a coin. The mechanism of the draws for each round is as follows:
In the draw for the round of 16, the eight top teams of each association are seeded and the eight clubs that passed the qualification round are unseeded.The seeded teams are drawn against the unseeded teams.
In the draws for the quarter-finals onwards, there are no seedings, and teams from the same group can be drawn against each other.

Bracket

Round of 16

|}

Quarter-finals

||colspan="2" rowspan="2" 

|}

*AEK Athens won by flip of a coin.

Semi-finals

||colspan="2" 

|}

Final

The 10th Greek Cup Final was played twice at the Leoforos Alexandras Stadium.

Replay match

References

External links
Greek Cup 1951-52 at RSSSF

Greek Football Cup seasons
Greek Cup
Cup